A Very Scalzi Christmas is a Christmas holiday-themed short story collection by John Scalzi published in November 2019.

Contents 
Ho Ho Intro, or, the Reason for the Season
Science Fictional Thanksgiving Grace
A Bitter November
The 10 Least Successful Holiday Specials of All Time
An Interview with Santa's Lawyer
A Personal Top 10 of Things That Are Not Titles to Christmas Songs and/or Lifetime Holiday Movies and Honestly I Don't Understand Why
Christmas in July
Interview with Santa's Reindeer Wrangler
8 Things You Didn't Know You Didn't Know About Your Favorite Holiday Music
Jackie Jones and Melrose Mandy
An Interview with the Christmas Bunny
Jangle the Elf Grants Wishes
Script Notes on the Birth of Jesus
Sarah's Sister
An Interview with the Nativity Innkeeper
Resolutions for the New Year: A Bullet Point List

Reception 
The collection was reviewed by Locus Magazine, Publishers Weekly, Kirkus Reviews, and Fantasy Literature.

References 

Christmas short story collections
2019 short story collections
Works by John Scalzi
American short story collections
Subterranean Press books